Move may refer to:

People
Daniil Move (born 1985), a Russian auto racing driver

Brands and enterprises
 Move (company), an online real estate company
 Move (electronics store), a defunct Australian electronics retailer
 Daihatsu Move

Government, law and politics
 Emigration
 Immigration

Organizations
 MOVE (Hungary), an early Hungarian fascist group
 MOVE (Philadelphia organization), a Philadelphia-based activist organization
 The Move (Sam Fife), a nondenominational Christian group

Science and technology

Computing
 Move (command), a shell command
 Move, a state transition of a finite state machine
 mv (short for move), a Unix command
Move, an upcoming programming language for the Diem (digital currency) blockchain

Other uses in science and technology
 Motion (physics)
 Move α, in linguistics, a feature of the Revised Extended Standard Theory (REST) of transformational grammar developed by Noam Chomsky

Arts, entertainment, and media

Films
 Move (1970 film), a comedy film directed by Stuart Rosenberg
 Move (2012 film), a German film

Music

Groups and labels
 Move (Japanese band), a Japanese group
 Move Records, a record label
 The Move, a 1960s rock band

Albums and EPs
 Move (EP), an EP by BtoB
 Move (Freak Kitchen album), 2002
 Move (Earl Klugh album), 1994
 Move (Taemin album), 2017
 Move (Third Day album), 2010
 Move (Yoshida Brothers album), 2000
 Move (The  Move album), a 1968 album by The Move

Songs
 "Move" (Baker Boy song), 2020
 "Move" (DNCE song), 2022
 "Move" (CSS song), 2008
 "Move" (Little Mix song), 2013
 "Move" (MercyMe song), 2011
 "Move" (Moby song), 1993
 "Move" (Q-Tip song), 2008
 "Move" (Taemin song), 2017
 "Move" (The Mamas song), 2020
 "Move" (Thousand Foot Krutch song)
 "Move (If You Wanna)", by Mims, 2008
 "Move", by the Move
 "Move", by Audio Adrenaline
 "Move", by Luke Bryan
 "Move", by Dance or Die
 "Move", by Denzil Best
 "Move", by H-Blockx
 "Move", by Inspiral Carpets from the album Life
 "Move", by Kris Allen from the 2016 album Letting You In
 "Move", by Saint Motel
 "Move" (sometimes written "M.O.V.E."), a song by Keith LeBlanc
 "Move (You're Steppin' on My Heart)", a song by The Dreamettes in the 1981 musical Dreamgirls and its 2006 motion picture
 "The Move", by the Beastie Boys from Hello Nasty

Other uses in arts, entertainment, and media
 CFXJ-FM, a rhythmic adult contemporary radio station in Toronto, branded as 93-5 The Move
 Move FM, a contemporary hit radio station in New South Wales
 Move Radio, an adult contemporary and hot adult contemporary radio network in Canada
 PlayStation Move, a motion controller for the PlayStation 3
 Move, a 2020 TV series
 The Move, an episode in Season 3 of Big City Greens

Other uses
 The Move (American football), the NFL relocation of the Cleveland Browns to Baltimore

See also
 Mauve
 Migration (disambiguation)
 Moove (disambiguation)
 Motion (disambiguation)
 Movement (disambiguation)
 Mover (disambiguation)
 Moves (disambiguation)
 Moving (disambiguation)
 Prime mover (disambiguation)
 Remove (disambiguation)